Rzalar (also, Rizalar) is a village in the Agdam Rayon of Azerbaijan.  The village forms part of the municipality of Qaradağlı.

References 

Populated places in Aghdam District